Barqan may refer to

Barkan, an Israeli settlement in the West Bank
Qasr-e Qand, a city in Iran